Amzor (or Anzor) Nikolayevich Ailarov (born 29 January 1982) is a Russian professional football official and a former player. He is the general director of FC Alania Vladikavkaz.

Club career
He made his debut in the Russian Premier League in 2002 for FC Alania Vladikavkaz.

References

1982 births
Sportspeople from Vladikavkaz
Living people
Russian footballers
Russia under-21 international footballers
Association football midfielders
FC Spartak Vladikavkaz players
Russian Premier League players
FC Salyut Belgorod players
FC Volgar Astrakhan players
FC SKA-Khabarovsk players